"You Win, I Lose" is a song by Supertramp. It is the second track on their tenth studio album Some Things Never Change. "You Win, I Lose" would also appear on Supertramp's 2005 compilation album Retrospectacle – The Supertramp Anthology.

Overview
The music video for "You Win, I Lose" was directed by David Hogan and stars Anna Nicole Smith.

Track listing

CD
 "You Win, I Lose" – 4:31
 "Some Things Never Change" (edit) – 5:05

CD
 "You Win, I Lose" (edit version) – 3:58
 "You Win, I Lose" (album version) – 4:31
 "Some Things Never Change" (edit version) – 5:05
 "Some Things Never Change" (album version) – 6:26

Personnel
Personnel according to the back cover.
 Rick Davies – music, lyrics, executive producer
 Jack Douglas – producer
 Jay Messina – engineer

Charts

References

1997 singles
Supertramp songs
Songs written by Rick Davies
1997 songs
EMI Records singles